The finswimming competition at the 2013 World Games took place on 26 to 27 July 2013 in Cali, Colombia, at the Hernando Botero Swimming Pool.

Participating nations

 Austria (4)
 China (10)
 Colombia (8)
 Chinese Taipei (1)
 Czech Republic (1)
 Estonia (4)
 France (5)
 Germany (6)
 Hungary (5)
 Italy (4)
 Japan (4)
 Poland (2)
 Russia (9)
 Slovakia (1)
 South Korea (10)
 Ukraine (10)

Medals table

Medals summary

Men

Women

References

External links
 Results book

2013 World Games
2013